Lucy Westlake (born November 4, 2003) is an American mountaineer from Naperville, Illinois. She became the youngest American woman to climb Mount Everest when she reached the summit on May 12, 2022. Westlake also became the youngest girl to summit all of the highest points of the contiguous United States when she was age 12 in 2016. In June 2021, Westlake also became the youngest female to climb all 50 of the US state peaks when she reached the summit of Denali in Alaska.  Westlake's other major ascents include Aconcagua, the highest peak in South America, Elbrus, the highest peak in Europe and Kilimanjaro, the highest peak in Africa.

Everest

Westlake reached the summit of Mount Everest on Thursday, May 12, 2022, at 5:36 a.m. The previous record was held by Samantha Larson of Long Beach, California, who reached the summit on May 16, 2007, at the age of 18 years, 7 months and 9 days old. Westlake reached the summit at the age of 18 years, 6 months and 8 days, which means she beat the record by about a month. Westlake started her expedition on April 18, and she summited 25 days later, which put her above the normal pace of 45 to 60 days to summit Everest. Lucy was accompanied by Mingma Chhiring Sherpa through the summit.

U.S. states summits 

Westlake became the youngest girl to summit all of the highest points of the contiguous United States at age 12 years, 8 months and 18 days on July 22, 2016, at Kings Peak in Utah. Westlake started mountain climbing in 2011 when she climbed Black Mountain, Kentucky's highest peak. In 2012, she climbed 13 US state peaks. She beat Kristen Kelliher of Vermont's record, who was 17 years old when she set the record in 2011.

Westlake completed her journey of summiting all 50 peaks on June 20, 2021, at Denali. She set a record as the youngest female, at 17 years, 7 months and 17 days old, to climb all 50 of the U.S. state highpoints by beating Kristen Kelliher, who was 18 years 1 month and 15 days old when she set the record in 2012. The climb also allowed Westlake and her father Rodney to claim the record of the youngest father-daughter team to climb all 50 state peaks. Previously, Westlake had attempted the climb in 2017, but hazardous conditions prevented them from making the final portion of the journey.

Other climbs 
Westlake aspires to become the youngest woman to complete the Explorers Grand Slam, by summiting Carstensz Pyramid in Papua New Guinea, Oceana, and Mount Vinson in Antarctica. She also still has to ski the last degree to the North and South poles to complete the record. She plans to complete these feats in 2023.

Running 
Westlake is an avid runner, who started competing at an early age in various races and competed throughout high school in cross country and track and field. By age four, she had convinced her parents to allow her to race in her town's 5K race. In her final high school race on November 7, 2021, she set a personal best in a three-mile race with a time of 16:55.54 at the Illinois Girl's Cross Country Class 3A State Championship while running for Naperville North High School. She placed ninth and Naperville North placed seventh overall. She is also an elite triathlete in the USA Triathlon Junior Elite Series.

Personal life 
Westlake was born on November 4, 2003, during a snowstorm in her family's cabin in Michigan's Upper Peninsula. Westlake's family lived in Mexico for a year when she was 6. In 2016, Westlake moved to Naperville, Illinois. Westlake attended Naperville North High School, and graduated a semester early in 2021 in order to climb Everest. Westlake plans to attend the University of Southern California where she has received a scholarship to compete in cross country and track and field.

References 

2003 births
Living people
People from Naperville, Illinois
American summiters of Mount Everest
American female climbers